Gorguiyeh (also Romanized as Gorgū’īyeh; also known as Gorgnow’īyeh and Kargū’īyeh) is a village in Bezenjan Rural District, in the Central District of Baft County, Kerman Province, Iran. At the 2006 census, its population was 17, in 6 families.

References 

Populated places in Baft County